Charles William Bardeen (1847 – August 19, 1924) was an American educator and publisher. He devoted his career to improve the education system of the United States. He was the father of Charles Russell Bardeen and grandfather of two-time Nobel Prize winning physicist John Bardeen. He was referred to as C.W. by the later generations of Bardeens.

Early life
C.W. was born in 1847 in Groton, Massachusetts, to an abolitionist family. He left school at the age of fourteen to enlist in the Northern Army in the American Civil War, where he signed up as a drummer boy. He was a poor drummer and because of that, he spent the Civil War as a fifer. After the end of the Civil War, he worked his way through Yale University, and graduated from Yale in 1869.

Career
After completing his graduation, C.W. found employment as a vice-principal and teacher, and held several positions as school principal, superintendent, and college English professor until 1873. His son Charles R. Bardeen was born in Kalamazoo, Michigan in 1871. C.W. moved his family to Syracuse, New York in 1874. He established his own publishing company, School Bulletin Publications, that year. He became managing editor of the School Bulletin in 1874 and retained that position for almost fifty years. The magazine became a forum for expressing his strong views on the importance of quality education. In the 1880s and 1890s, C.W. made a number of trips to Europe and northern Africa, and he wrote up his travel adventures for the Bulletin.

C.W. took positions of national leadership in the National Education Association and the Educational Press Association of America. He was invited for membership in the American Association for the Advancement of Science, the American Geographical Society, and the American Social Science Association.

Later life
In later years, C.W. frequently exchanged letters with his son, Charles R. Bardeen, in which they discussed issues about education, work, and life in general. He also filtered his experience and ideas with his grandchildren. C.W. sent A Little Fifer’s War Diary, an autobiographical memoir about his experiences during the American Civil War, to John Bardeen for his tenth birthday. C.W. died in Syracuse on August 19, 1924.

Notes

References

External links
 
  
 
 
 

1847 births
1924 deaths
People from Groton, Massachusetts
People of Massachusetts in the American Civil War
Educators from Massachusetts
Yale University alumni
Writers from Massachusetts